Guglielmo Adeodato, O.E.S.A. or Baldassare Monaco (died 1540) was a Roman Catholic prelate who served as Bishop of Lesina (1539–1540).

Biography
Guglielmo Adeodato was ordained a priest in the Order of Hermits of St. Augustine.
On 17 October 1539, he was appointed during the papacy of Pope Paul III as Bishop of Lesina.
He served as Bishop of Lesina until his death in 1540.

References 

16th-century Italian Roman Catholic bishops
Bishops appointed by Pope Paul III
1540 deaths
Augustinian bishops